Seikel Motorsport was a German auto racing team founded by Peter Seikel in 1968.  After running national series, the team moved on to touring car racing before finally grand tourer racing.  Peter Seikel officially retired in 2007 at the 24 Hours of Le Mans, officially ending the team as well.

Following a move to international motorsports in 1978, Seikel was part of Audi's presence in the European Touring Car Championship.  They aided Audi in winning the 1980 constructors championship, while Peter Seikel himself had taken the Group N drivers championship in 1979.  The team would later move to running BMWs, Fords, and Toyotas in the championship until it was dissolved in 1988.

Seikel would then be hired by Honda to develop the Civic for touring car racing, then running an NSX in the German national GT series.  However, in 1994 Seikel would move to Porsche, and concentrate on the new BPR Global GT Series, as well as running the 24 Hours of Le Mans.  The team ran BPR, as well as its later incarnation the FIA GT Championship until 1998 before concentrating solely on endurances races.  The team would earn class wins at the 6 Hours of Vallelunga and 1000km Monza.  However the team's best achievement would be a class win at the 2001 24 Hours of Le Mans.

With the creation of the new Le Mans Endurance Series in 2004, the team would concentrate on the series will also running Le Mans.  However, Peter Seikel decided to retire from motorsports at the end of 2006.  In 2007, Seikel contested their final race, having earned an automatic invitation from the 24 Hours of Le Mans organisers for their result the previous year.  Seikel would reach an agreement with Team Felbermayr-Proton to use their drivers while Seikel's men prepared the car.  The car would be unable to finish the race, marking the end of Seikel's racing career.

Peter Seikel also runs an off-road 4x4 company and rally team under the name Auto Seikel.

External links
 

German auto racing teams
Auto racing teams established in 1968
1968 establishments in Germany
24 Hours of Le Mans teams
European Le Mans Series teams
FIA GT Championship teams

American Le Mans Series teams